Eve Torres Gracie (born Eve Marie Torres on August 21, 1984) is an American actress, dancer, model, martial arts instructor, and former professional wrestler. She is currently signed with WWE, as an ambassador. She was the first ever three-time WWE Divas Champion.

Torres began her career as a model and dancer. She danced for The Southern California Summer Pro League and went on to become a member of the National Basketball Association's Los Angeles Clippers Spirit Dance Team for the 2006–2007 season. She also appeared on several television shows, including Show Me The Money, Sunset Tan, and Deal or No Deal.

In 2007, she won the 2007 Diva Search, earning a contract with WWE. Torres first appeared on WWE programming as a backstage interviewer in 2008 and became a full-time wrestler in 2009. She won the WWE Divas Championship in April 2010. She held the championship on a further two occasions, becoming the first person to win it three times. Following her retirement from professional wrestling in 2013, Torres focused on her role as an instructor for the Gracie Women Empowered self-defense program at the Gracie Jiu-Jitsu Academy in Torrance, California, and continued to act, with roles in Skiptrace and Supergirl.

Early life 
Torres was born in Boston, Massachusetts, and grew up in Denver, Colorado. Her father is Nicaraguan and her mother is of German and Swedish descent. She has a younger brother, Phil, who is a Explorer and biologist.

Torres attended the University of Southern California (USC) on a full tuition scholarship. During college, she was one of the founding members of the Omega Phi Beta sorority chapter on her campus and held the vice-president position for several years. While in Omega Phi Beta, Torres was awarded for Academic Excellence at the Order of Omega Greek Awards. She graduated with honors and a grade point average above 3.5 in May 2006, with a degree in Industrial and Systems Engineering.

Dancing and modeling career 
While attending USC, Torres appeared in commercials and music videos. Torres was the co-captain of the USC Fly Girls dance squad and created much of their choreography. She also danced for The Southern California Summer Pro League, the only summer league for National Basketball Association (NBA) players, in Long Beach, California. After graduating from college, she began dancing and modeling full-time. After reaching the tryout finals in previous years, Torres became a member of the NBA's Los Angeles Clippers Spirit Dance Team for the 2006–07 season. She also appeared on the game show Show Me The Money.

Professional wrestling career

World Wrestling Entertainment/WWE

Diva Search (2007) 
In May 2007, Torres entered World Wrestling Entertainment (WWE)'s Diva Search. She was chosen by WWE officials as one of the eight finalists from a group of 50 women. On October 29, 2007, in Philadelphia, live on Raw, she was crowned the 2007 WWE Diva Search winner, defeating finalist Brooke Gilbertsen and becoming a WWE Diva. Following her win, she began training for her wrestling debut in WWE's developmental territory, Ohio Valley Wrestling (OVW).

Main roster debut (2008–2009) 
Videos promoting Eve's debut on SmackDown! began airing on January 11, 2008. The promo aired for three weeks before Eve made her official debut on the February 1, 2008 episode of SmackDown interviewing Batista. During early 2008, Eve participated in a contest to determine the top Diva on SmackDown, participating in a bikini contest, an obstacle course, and an arm wrestling competition before being eliminated. Eve appeared at WrestleMania XXIV as a Lumberjill in the BunnyMania match between Maria and Ashley against Beth Phoenix and Melina. Eve spent the rest of the year competing in similar contests, including a dance-off and a bikini contest, before participating in the Halloween Costume Contest on October 26 at the Cyber Sunday pay-per-view, where she was dressed as Raphael from the Teenage Mutant Ninja Turtles. On the 800th episode of Raw on November 3, 2008, Eve made her televised in-ring debut in a 16-Diva tag team match, which her team lost although she was never tagged in.

Her first main storyline began in early 2009, when she began a scripted feud with Michelle McCool after McCool attacked her. On the February 6 episode of SmackDown, Eve made her singles match debut in a losing effort against McCool via submission. Their feud continued for the next few months, with them competing against each other in singles and tag team matches. Eve then moved into a feud with Layla in mid-2009. After the pair competed in dance and arm wrestling competitions, Eve defeated Layla on the May 29 episode of SmackDown in a wrestling match. On the June 18 episode of Superstars, Eve pinned Layla once again. After the match, they both shook hands.

Around the same as her scripted rivalry with Layla, Eve became associated with Cryme Tyme (Shad and JTG), appearing in several backstage segments with them. She also began accompanying them to the ring as their manager during their storyline rivalry with The Hart Dynasty (David Hart Smith, Tyson Kidd, and Natalya). Eve and Cryme Tyme participated in multiple six-person mixed tag team matches against The Hart Dynasty, and Eve also faced Natalya in singles matches and tag team matches involving other Divas. Her final match on SmackDown was on October 9, when she was defeated in a singles match by McCool.

Divas Champion (2009–2011) 

On October 12, 2009, Eve was traded to the Raw brand. On the November 2 episode of Raw, she competed in her first match after being traded: a battle royal which was won by Alicia Fox. She then entered into a storyline romance with Chris Masters in December 2009, becoming his valet, after Masters saved Eve from a confrontation with Chavo Guerrero. In a Christmas Edition of Raw, Eve kissed Chris Masters under the mistletoe after Masters defeated Carlito in a Single's match. Eve and Masters would continue their romantic storyline throughout early 2010 as the couple would share celebratory kisses and hugs after each match victory in the middle of the ring. In January 2010, the WWE Divas Championship was vacated and a tournament was set up to determine the new champion. Eve made it to the semi-finals, before being defeated by the eventual winner, Maryse. At WrestleMania XXVI Eve was on the losing team in a 10-Diva tag team match, but the following night on Raw, she pinned Maryse in a rematch to earn the victory for her team.On the April 5 episode of Raw, Eve won a "Dress to Impress" battle royal to become the number one contender to the WWE Divas Championship, and the following week on Raw, she defeated Maryse to win the championship for the first time. She successfully defended the championship against Maryse at the Over the Limit pay-per-view in May. At the Fatal 4-Way pay-per-view in June, Eve lost the championship in a fatal four-way match, when Alicia Fox pinned Maryse to win the championship. On the July 5 episode of Raw, Eve invoked her rematch clause against Fox but was unsuccessful after Fox feigned an ankle injury. As a result, she received another rematch at the Money in the Bank pay per-view, but lost again to Fox. In mid-2010 she began acting as the valet for R-Truth, entering another romantic storyline. The pair would enter a storyline feud with Ted DiBiase and Maryse.

At the Royal Rumble on January 30, 2011, the Raw General Manager added Eve to a two-on-one handicap match for the Divas Championship, turning it into a fatal four-way match. Eve pinned Layla to win the match and become a two-time Divas Champion. She retained the championship against Natalya in a Lumberjill match on the February 14 episode of Raw, and against Nikki Bella on the March 7 episode. She held the championship until the April 11 episode of Raw, when she lost it to Brie Bella.

Eve then formed an alliance with Kelly Kelly, and after Kelly won the Divas Championship in June, Eve accompanied her to the ring during her matches. Eve and Kelly began feuding with The Divas of Doom (Beth Phoenix and Natalya), and after Phoenix won the Divas Championship from Kelly, Eve defeated Natalya to earn a title match against Phoenix. She faced Phoenix at the Vengeance pay-per-view, but was unsuccessful. On the October 31 episode of Raw, Eve won a battle royal to become the number one contender to the Divas Championship. She received her championship match at the Survivor Series pay-per-view, but lost a Lumberjill match to Phoenix. She later described the match as her favorite.

Evil authority figure, Record Breaker and retirement (2011–2013) 
Eve moved into a storyline with Zack Ryder in December 2011, and the pair "won" a mixed tag team match against Natalya and Tyson Kidd on the December 26 episode of Raw. On the January 9, 2012 episode of Raw, Eve agreed to a date with Ryder beginning a storyline relationship. Eve quickly became involved in the storyline between Ryder, his ally John Cena, and Kane, who began targeting Ryder. After injuring Ryder, he turned his attention to Eve, and tried to attack her until he was stopped by Cena. On the February 6 episode of Raw, Eve suffered a legimiately broken nose when Beth Phoenix clotheslined her during a match. The following week, Cena saved Eve from being kidnapped by Kane, and Eve kissed him in thanks. On the February 20 episode of Raw, Eve became a villain after she confessed backstage to The Bella Twins that she had never liked Zack Ryder and didn't care about the injury he had suffered the previous week. She stated that she was using him for publicity and planned to take advantage of John Cena the same way. Cena overheard her revelation and scorned her as she begged for forgiveness. Eve justified her actions by stating that she had no problem using men to achieve her goals and that she was "a woman in a man's world." She wrestled her first match as a villain on the March 2 episode of SmackDown, defeating Natalya. Ryder returned on the March 5 episode of Raw, confronting Eve over her recent actions, but she managed to seduce him into forgiving her and the two shared a long backstage kiss.
At WrestleMania XXVIII, Eve and Beth Phoenix lost to Kelly Kelly and Extra correspondent Maria Menounos in a tag team match. Later that night, she accompanied Ryder to the ring for the Team Johnny vs. Team Teddy matchup where she distracted Ryder, costing him and Team Teddy the match. After the match she publicly humiliated him by kicking him in the groin, sending him to his knees in agony.

As a result, John Laurinaitis gave her a position of authority by appointing her as the Executive Administrator of Raw and SmackDown. Eve found the role to be a power trip and enjoyed abusing her position by bullying and humiliating people on numerous occasions. One such occasion was on the April 30 episode of Raw, when Eve fired the Bella Twins with cruel glee. She also publicly humiliated The Big Show in the middle of the ring by making him apologise for mocking John Laurinaitis, and threatened his job if he didn't comply. However, it was former SmackDown General Manager Theodore Long who Eve seemed to take the most pleasure in bullying. After finding himself working for Laurinaitis after his team's loss at Wrestlemania, Long was told that he would now be working under Eve and would report to her, a situation she clearly enjoyed. As Eve's subordinate, the next few weeks were hell for Long. She took great pleasure in humiliating him by forcing him to do menial, degrading tasks; such as making him wear an apron and name tag at all times, like a maid. As well as stand guard by a door dressed as a Queen's soldier. She also enjoyed ordering him to get her coffee and would throw the coffee all over him if it wasn't to her satisfaction. Long was also forced by Eve to rub oil on Antonio Cesaro for a photoshoot, this was particularly humiliating for Teddy as it was in front of his ex love interest (and Cesaro's current girlfriend) the evil Aksana, who seemed to find Long's predicament extremely entertaining.

Despite her new authority figure role, she continued to participate in matches throughout mid-2012. Eve's power trip eventually ended in June 2012 at No Way Out when John Laurinaitis was fired, therefore her role as Executive Administrator ended. On the August 10 episode of SmackDown, Eve asked SmackDown General Manager Booker T if she could be his assistant, but Kaitlyn was given the job instead. Eve threatened Booker T that she would tell the Board of Directors about his discriminatory hiring practices and was given a match against Kaitlyn the following week. Eve won the match and the job.

In August, she began a storyline where she appeared friendly and nice, diminishing her villainous characteristics. As part of this apparent personality change, she shook hands with her rival Kaitlyn following a match and teamed with her and Layla on the September 10 episode of Raw. At the Night of Champions pay-per-view, Kaitlyn was attacked and injured by a masked figure; as a result, Eve replaced Kaitlyn in a match against Divas Champion Layla, which she won. Her victory made her the first woman to hold the Divas Championship on three occasions. After Kaitlyn revealed her attacker was blonde, Eve accused Beth Phoenix, and attacked her on the September 24 episode of Raw. The following week, Eve suspended Phoenix, pending an investigation into Kaitlyn's attack. On the October 8 episode of Raw, Eve defeated Kaitlyn via submission to retain the Divas Championship, and following the match, Eve reverted to her heel persona and attempted to re-injure Kaitlyn, but was stopped by Layla. The following week, she defeated Layla to retain the championship. After the reveal that Kaitlyn was attacked by Aksana, under Eve's orders, the three-way feud led to a match at the Hell in a Cell pay-per-view, where Eve retained the Divas Championship against Layla and Kaitlyn in a triple threat match. Eve continued to feud with the duo, facing them in tag team matches with multiple partners and defeating Kaitlyn at Survivor Series to retain the championship. At Tables, Ladders & Chairs, Eve stopped Kaitlyn from winning a number one contender's match, and defeated winner Naomi to retain the title. Kaitlyn won a non-title match against Eve, and won the subsequent title match by disqualification on December 18, however Eve retained the championship. The rematch occurred on the January 7, 2013 episode of Raw, in which Eve successfully defended the championship after losing by count-out. The following week, on the special "20th Anniversary" episode of Raw, Eve lost the Divas Championship to Kaitlyn. She quit immediately following the loss in storyline. In reality, Torres had asked for her release in December 2012 to plan her upcoming wedding and focus on her role as an instructor for the Gracie Women Empowered self-defense program.

Ambassador (2013–present) 
On December 9, 2013, Torres appeared at the Slammy Award, presenting the Diva of the Year award to The Bella Twins.

Since April 2014, she has served as an ambassador for WWE. 

Torres appeared on the June 19, 2017 episode of Table for 3 on WWE Network alongside Kelly Kelly and Maryse. 

Torres has also taught her self-defence classes and appeared as a guest speaker at the WWE Performance Center. 

On October 28, 2018, Torres appeared on the pre-show for the first all-women's WWE pay-per-view, WWE Evolution, as well as in a video package during the main broadcast.

In April 2019, Torres appeared on the Raw Reunion broadcast in a segment with Maria Kanellis, Mike Bennett, and Eric Bischoff, as well as during the finale in-ring at the end of the show with fellow WWE Legends.

Other media 

In August 2008, Torres, along with fellow WWE Divas Maria and Candice Michelle, appeared on an episode of Sunset Tan. On October 2, 2008, Torres and Maria appeared on a special episode of Magic's Biggest Secrets Finally Revealed. Torres appeared on the November 3, 2009 episode of Deal or No Deal with Maria and Dolph Ziggler. On July 1, 2012, Torres, Kelly, and Michelle McCool appeared on Extreme Weight Loss. In 2012, she was part of NBC's celebrity reality competition series called Stars Earn Stripes; she won the competition on September 3, earning over $100,000 for her charity, the United Service Organizations. On September 7, 2012, Torres appeared on G4's Attack of the Show for an interview.

Torres, along with Maryse and Michelle McCool, appeared in the January 2009 issue of Muscle & Fitness magazine.

On April 30, 2012, it was announced that Torres would be featured in the WWE Studios and Kare Production Project "Les reines du ring" (English: Queens of the Ring), alongside fellow wrestlers The Miz and CM Punk. In mid-2013, Torres filmed a role for the film The Scorpion King 4: Quest for Power, which was released in 2015. She later earned a role in Matador as Reyna Flores, a journalist reporting on the leading character's career. The show was cancelled after a single season. In 2016, Torres appeared in the film Skiptrace as a Russian assassin. The same year, she appeared in an episode of the Supergirl television series as Maxima.

Torres has appeared in five WWE console games, including: WWE SmackDown vs. Raw 2010, WWE SmackDown vs. Raw 2011, WWE '12, WWE '13 and WWE 2K23 (DLC). She has also appeared in two mobile games, WWE SuperCard and WWE Universe.

Filmography

Film

Television

Championships and accomplishments 

 Inside The Ropes Magazine
 Diva of the Year (2012) – First Diva Three-Times Divas Champion
 Feud of the Year (2010) - with Maryse
 Guinness World Records
 World record: Most wins of the WWE Divas Championship (3 times) 
 Pro Wrestling Illustrated
 Ranked No. 5 of the top 50 female wrestlers in the PWI Female 50 in 2010
 World Wrestling Entertainment / WWE
 WWE Divas Championship (3 times)
 WWE Diva Search (2007)
 Ranked No. 40 of the top 50 Greatest WWE Female Superstars of all time (2021)

References

External links 

 
 
 
 

1984 births
American ballroom dancers
American female dancers
Dancers from Massachusetts
Female models from Massachusetts
American female professional wrestlers
American film actresses
Hispanic and Latino American dancers
Hispanic and Latino American actresses
American people of Nicaraguan descent
American people of German descent
American people of Swedish descent
American practitioners of Brazilian jiu-jitsu
American television actresses
Female Brazilian jiu-jitsu practitioners
Gracie family
Living people
Professional wrestlers from Massachusetts
Participants in American reality television series
Sportspeople from Boston
USC Viterbi School of Engineering alumni
WWE Diva Search contestants
21st-century American women
21st-century professional wrestlers
WWE Divas Champions